Poland competed at the 1994 Winter Olympics in Lillehammer, Norway.

Competitors
The following is the list of number of competitors in the Games.

Alpine skiing

Men

Men's combined

Biathlon

Men

Women

Cross-country skiing

Women

 2 Starting delay based on 5 km results. 
 C = Classical style, F = Freestyle

Figure skating

Luge

Nordic combined 

Events:
 normal hill ski jumping
 15 km cross-country skiing

Ski jumping

Speed skating

Men

Women

References

Official Olympic Reports
 Olympic Winter Games 1994, full results by sports-reference.com

Nations at the 1994 Winter Olympics
1994
1994 in Polish sport